Avatika is an uninhabited island near Avatoru in the Tuamotus Islands in French Polynesia (Oceania). The neighbouring islands are Motu Mahuta and Motu Teavahia and together they form part of the Rangiroa atoll.

See also 

 Desert island
 List of islands

References 

Geography of the Tuamotus
Uninhabited islands of French Polynesia